Alhaji (or Alhaji dan Kutumbi) was a Sultan of Kano who reigned from 1648 to 1649.

Biography in the Kano Chronicle
Below is a biography of Alhaji from Palmer's 1908 English translation of the Kano Chronicle.

References

Monarchs of Kano